Lentalius dorsopictus is a species of beetle in the family Cerambycidae, and the only species in the genus Lentalius. It was described by Fairmaire in 1902.

References

Petrognathini
Beetles described in 1902